Gerry is both a surname and a masculine or feminine given name. As a given name, it is often a short form (hypocorism) of Gerard, Gerald or Geraldine. Notable people with the name include:

Surname
Elbridge Gerry (1744–1814), fifth US vice president (1813–1814) after whom the term gerrymander was named
Ann Gerry (1763–1849), wife of Elbridge
Thomas Russell Gerry (1794–1848), son of Elbridge and Ann
Elbridge Thomas Gerry (1837–1927), American lawyer and reformer, son of Thomas
Peter G. Gerry (1879–1957), U.S. Senator from Rhode Island, great grandson of Elbridge
Edith Stuyvesant Gerry (1873–1958), American philanthropist and wife of Peter
Elbridge T. Gerry Sr. (1908–1999), American banker and polo player, great-great grandson of the vice president
Robert L. Gerry Jr. (1911–1979), American polo player, brother of Elbridge Sr
Robert L. Gerry III (born 1937), American businessman, son of Robert L. Jr
 Alan Gerry (born 1929), American billionaire and founder of Cablevision Industries
 Elbridge Gerry (Maine politician) (1813–1886), American lawyer and politician
 Eloise Gerry (1885–1970), American forestry research scientist
 Nathan Gerry (born 1995), American football player
 Robert Gerry (politician) (1858–1931), American politician

Given name
 Gerard Gerry Adams (born 1948), Irish republican politician
 Gerry Adams Sr. (1926–2003), Irish Republic Army volunteer, father of the Irish politician and alleged abuser of his family
 Gerry Adams (fencer) (born 1962), Australian fencer
 Doroteo Gerardo Gerry Alanguilan Jr. (1968–2019), Filipino comic book artist and writer
 Gerald Gerry Armstrong (activist) (born 1946), critic and former member of the Church of Scientology
 Gerard Gerry Armstrong (footballer) (born 1954), Northern Irish footballer
 Gerry Barney (born 1939), British designer
Gerry Bohanon (born 1999), American football player
 Joseph Gaétan Robert Gérald Gerry Boulet (1946–1990), Canadian rock singer
 Gerry Bertier (1953–1981), Virginia high school football player
 Gerry Brown (disambiguation)
 Gerard Gerry Brownlee (born 1956), New Zealand politician
 Gerry Byrne (politician) (born 1966), Canadian politician
 Gerald Gerry Byrne (footballer, born 1938) (1938–2015), English footballer
 Gerald Gerry Cheevers (born 1940), Canadian retired National Hockey League goaltender, member of the Hockey Hall of Fame
 Gerry Cinnamon, Scottish musician born Gerald Crosbie in 1985
 Gerry Collins (disambiguation)
 Gerry Cooney (born 1956), American former boxer
 Gerry Davis (disambiguation)
 Gerry Dee, Canadian comedian born Gerard Donoghue in 1968
 Gerry De Silva (born 1940), general, Commander of the Sri Lanka Army from 1994-1996
 Gerry Dick, American journalist and host of Inside Indiana Business
 Geraldine Ferraro (1935–2011), American attorney and politician, first female US vice presidential candidate
 Gerald Gerry Francis (born 1951), English former footballer and manager
 Gerald Gerry Francis (footballer, born 1933), South African-born footballer, first black footballer to play for Leeds United
 Pierce Gerry Geran (1896–1981), American ice hockey player
 Gerry Glaude (1927–2017), Canadian ice hockey defenceman
 Gerald Gerry Goffin (1939–2014), American lyricist, husband of Carole King
 Gerry Harris (disambiguation), multiple people
 Gerry Harvey (born 1939), Australian entrepreneur 
 Gerald Gerry Hitchens (1934–1983), English footballer
 Gerald Gerry Kearby (1947–2012), entrepreneur of the "dot-com" boom of the late 1990s
 Gerard Gerry Kelly (born 1953), Irish republican politician and former Provisional Irish Republican Army volunteer
 Gerald Gerry Kelly (broadcaster) (born 1948), Northern Irish broadcaster and journalist
 Gerard Gerry Kelly (footballer) (1908–1983), English footballer
 Gerry Leonard (born 1961/1962), Irish musician
 Gerald Gerry Lindgren (born 1946), American track and field runner
 Gerry McMonagle, political figure in Ireland
 Gerry McCoy (born 1960), Scottish footballer
 Gerard Gerry Marsden (born 1942), English musician, frontman of Gerry and the Pacemakers
 Gerry Morrow (born 1949), Martinique-born Canadian professional wrestler
 Gerald Gerry Mulligan (1927–1996), American jazz saxophonist, clarinetist, arranger and composer
 Gerry Murphy (disambiguation)
 Gerry O'Connor (disambiguation)
 Geronimo Gerry Peñalosa (born 1972), Filipino former boxer and WBC and WBO world champion
 Gerald Gerry Peyton (born 1956), Irish former football goalkeeper and coach
 Gerry Phillips (born 1940), Canadian former politician
 Gerald Gerry Rafferty (1947–2011), Scottish singer and songwriter
 Gerard Gerry Reynolds (Irish politician) (born 1961), Irish politician
 Gerald Gerry Reynolds (British politician) (1927–1969), British politician
 Gerardo Roxas (1924–1982), Filipino politician
 Gerry Ryan (disambiguation)
 Phillip Edward Gerald Gerry Sayer (1905–1942), chief test pilot for Gloster Aircraft
 Geraldine Mary Gerry Scott (1944–2007), English television production designer
 Virginio Gerry Scotti (born 1956), Italian television presenter
 Gerry Sharpe (disambiguation)
 Gerald Gerry Sherry, American football player
 Gerald Gerry Spence (born 1929), American semi-retired trial lawyer
 Gerald Gerry Steinberg (1945–2015), British politician
 Gerard Gerry Sutcliffe (born 1953), British politician
 Gerald Gerry Tuttle (1926–2006), American football player
 Gerald Gerry Ward (footballer) (1936–1994), English footballer
 Gerald Gerry Ward (basketball) (born 1941), American retired National Basketball Association player
 Gerry Bubba Watson (born 1978), American golfer
 Gerry Williams (footballer) (1877–1901), Australian rules footballer

Fictional characters
 Gerry, a character from The Ridonculous Race
 Gerard 'Gerry' Keays from  The Magnus Archives

See also 
Gery (disambiguation)
Geraldine (disambiguation)
Gerhard, a male given name
Geri (disambiguation)
Jerry (given name)

Hypocorisms
Masculine given names